Gordian III (20 January 225 –  February 244) was Roman emperor from 238 to 244. At the age of 13, he became the youngest sole  emperor of the united Roman Empire. Gordian was the son of Antonia Gordiana and Junius Balbus, who died before 238. Antonia Gordiana was the daughter of Emperor Gordian I and younger sister of Emperor Gordian II. Very little is known of his early life before his acclamation. Gordian had assumed the name of his maternal grandfather in 238.

Rise to power

In 235, following the murder of Emperor Alexander Severus in Moguntiacum (modern Mainz), the capital of the Roman province Germania Superior, Maximinus Thrax was acclaimed emperor. In the following years, there was a growing opposition against Maximinus in the Roman Senate and amongst the majority of the population of Rome. In 238, a rebellion broke out in the Africa Province, where Gordian's grandfather and uncle, Gordian I and II, were proclaimed joint emperors. This revolt was suppressed within a month by Cappellianus, governor of Numidia and a loyal supporter of Maximinus Thrax.

The Senate, showing its hostility towards Maximinus by supporting the Gordiani, elected Pupienus and Balbinus as joint emperors. These senators were not popular men, so the Senate decided to raise Marcus Antonius Gordianus to the rank of Caesar.  Maximinus, moving quickly to attack the Senate's newly elected emperors, encountered difficulties marching his army through an Alpine winter. Arriving at Aquileia and short on supplies, Maximinus besieged the city. After four weeks, Maximinus' demoralized army mutinied and the Legio II Parthica murdered him.

The situation for Pupienus and Balbinus, despite Maximinus' death, was doomed from the start with popular riots, military discontent and an enormous fire that consumed Rome in June 238. The next month, Pupienus and Balbinus were killed by the Praetorian Guard and Gordian proclaimed sole emperor.

Reign

Due to Gordian's age, the imperial government was surrendered to the aristocratic families, who controlled the affairs of Rome through the Senate. In 240, Sabinianus revolted in the African province, but he was quickly defeated. In 241, Gordian was married to Furia Sabinia Tranquillina, daughter of the newly appointed praetorian prefect, Timesitheus. As chief of the Praetorian Guard and father in law of the Emperor, Timesitheus quickly became the de facto ruler of the Roman Empire.

During Gordian's reign there were severe earthquakes, so severe that cities fell into the ground along with their inhabitants. In response to these earthquakes Gordian consulted the Sibylline books.

By the 3rd century, the Roman frontiers weakened against the Germanic tribes across the Rhine and Danube, and the Sassanid Empire across the Euphrates increased its own attacks. When the Sasanians under Shapur I invaded Mesopotamia, the young emperor opened the doors of the Temple of Janus for the last time in Roman history, and sent a large army to the East. The Sassanids were driven back over the Euphrates and defeated in the Battle of Resaena (243). The campaign was a success and Gordian, who had joined the army, was planning an invasion of the enemy's territory, when his father-in-law died in unclear circumstances. Without Timesitheus, the campaign, and the Emperor's security, were at risk. Due to the campaign's success, Gordian celebrated with a triumph and boasted about his achievements to the Senate. 
 
Gaius Julius Priscus and, later on, his own brother Marcus Julius Philippus, also known as Philip the Arab, stepped in at this moment as the new Praetorian Prefects Gordian would then start a second campaign. Around February 244, the Sasanians fought back fiercely to halt the Roman advance to Ctesiphon. 

The eventual fate of Gordian after the battle is unclear. Sasanian sources claim that a battle occurred (Battle of Misiche) near modern Fallujah (Iraq) and resulted in a major Roman defeat and the death of Gordian III. One view holds that Gordian died at Zaitha, murdered by his frustrated army, while the role of Philip is unknown. Scholarly analyses suggest the Sasanian version, "while defective[,] is superior" to the Roman one. 

The deposition of Gordian's body is also a matter of controversy. According to David S. Potter, Philip transferred the body of the deceased emperor to Rome and arranged for his deification. Edwell, Dodgeon, and Lieu state that Philip had Gordian buried at Zaitha after the campaign against the Sasanians had ended in failure.

Family tree

References

Sources

External links

 Meckler, Michael, "Gordian III (238–244 A.D.)", De Imperatoribus Romanis
 Ammianus Marcellinus, The Later Roman Empire (AD354-378), 23.5.7

225 births
244 deaths
3rd-century murdered monarchs
3rd-century Roman emperors
Imperial Roman consuls
Crisis of the Third Century
Roman emperors murdered by the Praetorian Guard
Deified Roman emperors
Ancient child monarchs
People of the Roman–Sasanian Wars
Antonii
Roman emperors killed in battle
Gordian dynasty